The Sixteen series of scooters are produced by Suzuki with  up to  versions. They were introduced in late 2007 and started shipping in 2008. Suzuki created this new series in order to compete with the well-known Honda SH series in the high-wheel scooter market. Suzuki introduced both models 125cc and 150 at the same time.

External links

Sixteen
Motorcycles introduced in 2007
Motor scooters